Abdul Atif Al-Qahtani is a Saudi Arabian Olympic javelin thrower. He represented his country in the men's javelin throw at the 1972 Summer Olympics. His distance was 53.06 in the qualifiers.

References

Living people
1946 births
Saudi Arabian male javelin throwers
Olympic athletes of Saudi Arabia
Athletes (track and field) at the 1972 Summer Olympics
Olympic male javelin throwers